Gerson Da Silva Domingos (born 16 April 1996) is an Angolan basketball player who plays for Petro de Luanda of the Basketball Africa League (BAL).

Professional career
Domingos  started playing for the G.D. Interclube in 2017. In 2021, Domingos signed with Petro de Luanda.

National team career
Domingos played with Angolan under-18 team at the 2014 FIBA Africa Under-18 Championship in Madagascar. He was named the MVP of the tournament, after averaging 18.9 points and 2.6 assists over seven games. Angola finished in the fourth place.
 
Later in his career, Domingos represented the Angolan senior team at the 2019 FIBA Basketball World Cup in China, where he averaged 8.5 points, 2.5 rebounds and 2.5 assists per game.

BAL career statistics

|-
|style="text-align:left;"|2021
|style="text-align:left;"|Petro de Luanda
| 6 || 0 || 11.4 || .333 || .333 || 1.000 || 1.3 || 1.2 || 0.3 || .0 || 3.0
|- class="sortbottom"
| style="text-align:center;" colspan="2"|Career
| 6 || 0 || 11.4 || .333 || .333 || 1.000 || 1.3 || 1.2 || 0.3 || .0 || 3.0

References

1996 births
Living people
C.D. Primeiro de Agosto men's basketball players
Atlético Petróleos de Luanda basketball players
G.D. Interclube men's basketball players
2019 FIBA Basketball World Cup players
Angolan men's basketball players
Point guards